John W. Goodgame (August 28, 1893 – August 28, 1962) was an American Negro league pitcher in the 1910s.

A native of Talladega, Alabama, Goodgame attended Atlanta Baptist College and Talladega College. He made his Negro leagues debut in 1911 with the Leland Giants, and played for the Brooklyn Royal Giants and Chicago Giants the following season. Goodgame died in Birmingham, Alabama in 1962 at age 69.

References

External links
Baseball statistics and player information from Baseball-Reference Black Baseball Stats and Seamheads

1893 births
1962 deaths
Brooklyn Royal Giants players
Chicago Giants players
Leland Giants players
Baseball pitchers
Baseball players from Alabama
People from Talladega, Alabama
20th-century African-American sportspeople